A Gerondas, is an Elder in the Greek Orthodox Church, similar to the Starets of the Russian Orthodox Church. They are usually monks, particularly Hieromonks.  The female equivalent would be a Gerontissa (Γερόντισσα).

See also
 Caloyers

References 

Greek words and phrases